Kap (Jaume Capdevila) was born in 1974 in Berga, Barcelona, Spain. He is a cartoonist and caricaturist in some journals of Barcelona:  La Vanguardia and El Mundo Deportivo among others. He also draws for websites, such as El último mono Garabatolandia, and Kapdigital

He earned a Bachelor of Fine Arts at the University of Barcelona. He published several books with his cartoons and political caricatures. In 2009 he was awarded the Gat Perich International Humor Prize.

He has exhibited his work in Barcelona, Berga, Manresa, Figueres, Tarragona, Lleida, Zaragoza, Madrid, Valencia, Porto, Lisboa, París and México.  His work is syndicated by Cagle Cartoons.

Capdevila is author and co-author of many works on the history of Spanish cartoon, caricature and many subjects related to graphical humor. He was a biographer of Catalan cartoonists such as Bagaria and Tísner. He wrote about the state of Catalan satire in the Spanish media about comics Tebeosfera.

He acted as curator of exhibits related to this theme including "Trazos", a view of one hundred of years of history through the cartoons of El Mundo Deportivo, the oldest sports journal in Spain, and about cartoonists such as Joaquim Muntañola ("L'art de riure, l'art de viure"), or "Tísner".

Work

Cartoon books

1997 Sense Kap ni peus
1999 Barça: 100 años de buen humor
2001 La Patumàquia
2003 El Milhomes (Colectivo)
2007 El Maragallato
2007 Tiro al blanco Colección Pelotazos, n.1
2007 Aquellos maravillosos años Colección Pelotazos, n.2
2007 La cuadratura del círculo virtuoso Colección Pelotazos, n.3
2007 Cosas del Barça Colección Pelotazos, n.4
2007 Comunica con humor (Collective)
2009 El Ave con humor (Collective)
2009 Manar! Manar!
2011 Bojos pel futbol
2012 Enfoteu-vos-en! Humor indignat (Collective)

Essay and theory books

2006 Trazos. Un siglo de ilustración y buen humor en Mundo Deportivo2006 Muntañola. L'art de riure, l'art de viure2006 Señor director... Col. Barcelona una ciudad de Vanguardia, n.17
2007 Bagaria. La guerra no fa riure2009 L'humor gràfic de Tísner. Una aproximació a les caricatures d'Avel·lí Artís Gener.2009 Canya al Borbó! Iconografia satírica de la monarquia espanyola.2010 Los Borbones a parir. Iconografía satírica de la monarquía española.2011 Andreu Damesón. Geni de la caricatura amb Lluís Solà i Dachs.

Illustrated books¡Que sabrá usted de fútbol!Los 200 mejores chistes deportivosUrruti t'estimo!El cabàs de micacosGuia del BerguedàEl tres i el set números meravellososLlegendes dels capgrossos i els gegants d'EspluguesEl Quixot dels ignorantsUn tresor entre torres i altres narracionsRestaurantes originales de BarcelonaAmores In-Perfectos¡Qué rabia da!La BugaderaManual del bon patumaireGuia d'orientació per patumairesHistoria de España para DummiesCocina fácil para DummiesDormir bien para DummiesJubilación para DummiesDeclaración de renta para Dummies''

See also 
 ¡Cu-Cut!

References

1974 births
Spanish caricaturists
Spanish cartoonists
Spanish editorial cartoonists
Living people